Glutathione S-transferase A3 is an enzyme that in humans is encoded by the GSTA3 gene.

Cytosolic and membrane-bound forms of glutathione S-transferase are encoded by two distinct supergene families. These enzymes are involved in cellular defense against toxic, carcinogenic, and pharmacologically active electrophilic compounds. At present, eight distinct classes of the soluble cytoplasmic mammalian glutathione S-transferases have been identified: alpha, kappa, mu, omega, pi, sigma, theta and zeta. This gene encodes a glutathione S-transferase belonging to the alpha class genes that are located in a cluster mapped to chromosome 6. Genes of the alpha class are highly related and encode enzymes with glutathione peroxidase activity. However, during evolution, this alpha class gene diverged accumulating mutations in the active site that resulted in differences in substrate specificity and catalytic activity. The enzyme encoded by this gene catalyzes the double bond isomerization of precursors for progesterone and testosterone during the biosynthesis of steroid hormones. An additional transcript variant has been identified, but its full length sequence has not been determined.

References

Further reading